Grenville was an electoral district of the Legislative Assembly in the Australian state of Victoria from 1859 to 1927. It was located in western Victoria, south of Ballarat.

Members
Two members initially, one from 1904.

 = elected in a by-election
 = died in office

Grenville was preceded by the "Electoral district of Polwarth, Ripon, Hampden and South Grenville" and "Electoral district of North Grenville" which were both original districts of the first Legislative Assembly of 1856 and was abolished in 1859.

The Electoral district of Warrenheip and Grenville was created in 1927 after Grenville was abolished.

Arthur Hughes, the last member for Grenville, represented Electoral district of Hampden from April 1927.

Election results

References

Former electoral districts of Victoria (Australia)
1859 establishments in Australia
1927 disestablishments in Australia